Steve Russ (born September 16, 1972) is an American football linebackers coach for the Washington Commanders of the National Football League (NFL). He played college football as a linebacker for the Air Force Falcons at the United States Air Force Academy, and was drafted by the Denver Broncos in the seventh round of the 1995 NFL Draft. He also played for the Los Angeles Xtreme in the original XFL, and has been a coach since 2001.

References

External links
Just Sports Stats
Los Angeles Xtreme profile
Washington Commanders profile

1972 births
Living people
People from Taylor County, Wisconsin
Players of American football from Wisconsin
American football linebackers
Air Force Falcons football players
Denver Broncos players
Ohio Bobcats football coaches
Syracuse Orange football coaches
Los Angeles Xtreme players
Carolina Panthers coaches
Washington Commanders coaches
Washington Football Team coaches
Military personnel from Wisconsin